Theodore J. Mooney is a fictional character on the 1960s CBS situation comedy The Lucy Show, portrayed by Gale Gordon.

Mooney was the president of the local bank in Lucy Carmichael's (Lucille Ball) hometown of Danfield.  As such, he was also the trustee of an apparently sizable trust fund of which the widowed Mrs. Carmichael was the beneficiary, left to her by her late husband.  Much of the series' humor in its early episodes was based around Lucy's attempts to get Mooney to allow her to invade the principal of the trust, with Mooney steadfastly resisting Lucy's often harebrained schemes.  Gordon joined the show at the beginning of its second season in September 1963, and in a two-part episode that introduced the character, the tone of their frequently antagonistic relationship was immediately set, as Lucy accidentally locked herself and Mooney in the bank vault overnight. Gordon was to have joined the series at its premiere in 1962, but he was still contractually obligated to his role as Mr. Wilson on Dennis the Menace. Consequently, Charles Lane played the similar Mr. Barnsdahl character in The Lucy Show’s first season.

Eventually, Lucy had spent so much of her time and efforts at the bank that it seemed logical to make her a paid bank employee, and she became such, serving as Mooney's secretary.  In the series' later years, both Mooney and Lucy moved to California, where Mooney became vice president of a larger bank and Lucy again served as his secretary.  The Mooney character's role expanded with the shift in locale to California, as The Lucy Show'''s other costar, Vivian Vance, left the series at the same time. Mooney became a key figure in nearly every episode from this point on.  The Mooney character is best remembered for his ill-temper and shouting outbursts at the incompetent "Mrs. Carmichael".  During their time in Danfield, he also did battle with Lucy's school friend, the Countess Framboise (née Rosie Harrigan, and played by Ann Sothern), who had been widowed herself by her husband, who was badly in debt.  Since she was looking for money to pay off his debts, she crossed swords with Mr. Mooney, whom she invariably called "Mr. Money".

When The Lucy Show ended in 1968, Gordon moved to Ball's new show Here's Lucy in the role of Lucy's brother-in-law, Harry Carter, a character similar in temperament and demeanor to Mooney. He remained with the new program until it left the CBS lineup in 1974. He then played the similar character Curtis McGibbon on the short-lived Life with Lucy in 1986. Gordon would reprise the character one last time in the first episode of the 1991 sitcom Hi Honey, I'm Home!''

Television characters introduced in 1963
American sitcom television characters
Fictional bankers